Cedrik-Marcel Stebe was the defending champion but chose not to defend his title.

Dragoș Dima won the title after defeating Jelle Sels 6–3, 6–2 in the final.

Seeds

Draw

Finals

Top half

Bottom half

References 
Main Draw
Qualifying Draw

Sibiu Open - Singles
2018 Singles